This list lists achievements and distinctions of various first ladies of the United States. It includes distinctions achieved in their earlier life and post-first lady service.

There have been forty-two official first ladies and forty-five first ladyships. This discrepancy exists because some presidents remarried while in office and some were not married so had no official first lady.

Also note that first ladies not recognized by the National First Ladies' Library listing include Martha Jefferson Randolph, Emily Donelson, Sarah Yorke Jackson, Angelica Van Buren, Priscilla Tyler, Mary McElroy, Rose Cleveland, Mary McKee, and Margaret Woodrow Wilson.

Martha Washington 

 First first lady to be born in Virginia.
 First first lady to have been born in the 18th century.
 First first lady.
 First first lady to have had children when she became first lady.
 First first lady to outlive her children.
 First first lady to have a U.S. military ship named in her honor.
 First first lady to outlive her husband.
 First first lady to be older than her husband.
 First first lady (and first American woman) to appear on a U.S. postage stamp.

Abigail Adams 

 First first lady to be born in Massachusetts.
 First first lady to serve as Second Lady and First Lady on the same day.
 First first lady to live in the White House.
 First first lady to also be the mother of a president.
 First first lady to have been a second lady.
 First first lady to die before her husband.
 First first lady to be younger than her husband.
 First first lady to have biological children with her husband.

Martha Jefferson Randolph 

 First first lady to give birth to a child in the White House.
 First first lady to not be the sitting president's wife. She was his daughter.

Dolley Madison 

First first lady to be born in North Carolina.
 First first lady to have a parrot as a pet at the White House.
 First first lady given an honorary seat on the floor of Congress.
 First first lady to respond to a telegraph message.
 First first lady to die at over eighty years old.
First first lady to be taller than the President.
First first lady to be photographed.

Louisa Adams 

 First first lady born outside of the United States; she was born in England.
 First first lady to have a non-American parent; her mother was English.
 First first lady to have both houses of the United States Congress adjourn in mourning on the day of her funeral.

Sarah Yorke Jackson 

 First first lady to be born in Pennsylvania
 First first lady to have been born in the 19th century.
 First first lady to have a post first ladyship of 50 years.

Anna Harrison 

 First first lady to be born in New Jersey.
 First first lady to be widowed while holding the title.
 First first lady to be granted by law a pension as a president's widow.
 First first lady to be the grandmother of a president.

Letitia Tyler 

 First first lady to die in the White House.

Julia Tyler 

First first lady to be born in New York 
First first lady to marry a president who was already in office at the time of the wedding.

Sarah Polk 
 
 First first lady to be born in Tennessee
 First first lady to be photographed while in office.
 First first lady to serve as a secretary to the president.
 First first lady to have no children.
 First first lady to host an annual Thanksgiving dinner at the White House.

Abigail Fillmore 

 
 First first lady to hold a job while married (she was a teacher).
 First first lady to establish a permanent White House library.

Harriet Lane 

 First first lady to be officially recognized as first lady while not being married to a President. (She was James Buchanan's niece, but is still considered an official first lady.)

Mary Todd Lincoln 

 First first lady to be born in Kentucky
First first lady to hold séances in the White House.

Julia Grant 

 First first lady to be born in Missouri.
 First first lady recorded on film.
 First first lady to write her memoirs (The Personal Memoirs of Julia Dent Grant).

Lucy Hayes 

 First first lady to be born in Ohio.
 First first lady to earn a college degree.
 First first lady to ban all alcoholic beverages from the White House.
First first lady to host an Easter Egg roll on the White House lawn.

Frances Cleveland 

 First first lady to marry in the White House.
 First first lady to have a child in the White House.
 First first lady to preside at two non-consecutive administrations.
 First first lady to remarry after being widowed.

Caroline Harrison 

 First first lady to use electricity.
 First first lady to raise a Christmas tree in the White House.
First first lady to have written a speech she delivered herself.

Edith Roosevelt 

 First first lady to be born in Connecticut.
 First first lady to travel abroad while in office.

Helen Taft 

 First first lady to own and drive a car.
 First first lady to ride in her husband's inaugural parade.
 First first lady to support women's suffrage.
 First first lady to publish her memoirs.
 First first lady to smoke cigarettes.
 First first lady to successfully lobby for safety standards in federal workplaces.
 First first lady to plant the first cherry tree saplings that are along Washington, D.C.'s Tidal Basin.
 First first lady to be buried in Arlington National Cemetery.

Edith Wilson 

 First first lady to unofficially assume presidential functions.

Florence Harding 

 First first lady to vote.
 First first lady to fly in an airplane.
 First first lady to operate a movie camera.
 First first lady to own a radio.
 First first lady to invite movie stars to the White House.

Grace Coolidge 

 First first lady to born in Vermont.
 First first lady to earn a four-year undergraduate degree.
 First first lady to speak in sound newsreels.

Lou Hoover 

 First first lady to be born in Iowa.
 First first lady to make regular nationwide radio broadcasts.

Eleanor Roosevelt 

 First first lady to hold regular press conferences.
 First first lady to write a daily newspaper column and to write a monthly magazine column.
 First first lady to host a weekly radio show.
 First first lady to fly in an airplane while first lady; she flew with Amelia Earhart in April 1933.
 First first lady to speak at a national party convention (1940).
 First first lady to be depicted as part of a presidential memorial (the Franklin Delano Roosevelt Memorial).
 First first lady to be the niece of a former president.
 First first lady (and only) to serve in the role for 12 years (1933-1945); to date.

Bess Truman 
 
 First first lady to live to the age of 90. She died on October 18, 1982, at the age of 97.

Mamie Eisenhower 

 First first lady to initiate Halloween decorations to be put up in the White House.

Jacqueline Kennedy 

 First first lady to be born in a hospital.
 First first lady to be from the 'Silent Generation'.
 First first lady to be born in the 20th century.
 First first lady to be Catholic.
 First first lady to hire a press secretary.
 First first lady to hire a White House curator.
 First first lady to win an Emmy Award.
 First first lady to select a theme for the White House Christmas Tree.

Lady Bird Johnson 

 First first lady to be born in Texas.
 First first lady to become a millionaire in her own right.
 First First Lady from the Greatest Generation

Pat Nixon 

 First first lady to be born in Nevada.
 First first lady to enter a combat zone.
 First first lady to travel to Africa, the People's Republic of China and to the Soviet Union.
 First first lady to wear pants in public.
 First first lady to address a Republican National Convention (1972).

Betty Ford 

 First first lady to be born in Illinois.
 First first lady to have a successful battle against dependency on drugs and alcohol, and openly talk about it.

Rosalynn Carter 

 First first lady to keep her own office in the East Wing.
 First first lady to have a VCR in the White House.
 First first lady to be married 76 years.

Nancy Reagan 

 First first lady invited to address the United Nations General Assembly.
 First first lady married to a divorcé.

Barbara Bush 

 First first lady to live to see a son become president.
 First first lady to have lived at both Number One Observatory Circle and the White House.
 First first lady to hire an African-American as her press secretary.
 First first lady to throw out a ball to open the baseball season.
 First first lady to have been married for 73 years.
 First first lady to die in the same year as her husband.

Hillary Clinton 

 First first lady to earn a postgraduate degree.
 First first lady to earn a professional doctor's degree: Juris Doctor.
 First first lady to have her own professional career up to the time of entering the White House.
 First first lady to wear trousers in an official first lady portrait.
 First first lady with an office in the West Wing.
 First first lady to appear on the cover of Vogue (1998).
 First first lady to win a Grammy Award.
 First first lady to be subpoenaed to testify before a federal grand jury.
 First first lady to run for and to win elected office (for senator from New York in 2000).
 First first lady to march in an LGBT pride parade (2000).
 First first lady to run for president (election in 2008).
 First first lady to have served in the cabinet and be in the presidential line of succession, as secretary of state.
 First first lady to be nominated for president by a major U.S. political party (specifically, the Democratic Party, in 2016).
 First first lady to have won the popular vote in the United States presidential elections.
 First first lady to serve as Chancellor at Queen's University Belfast (began 5-year term in January 2020).
 First first lady to be an electoral college elector (election in 2020).

Laura Bush 

 First first lady to give birth to twins.
 First first lady to substitute for the president in the president's weekly radio address.
 First first lady to have a mother-in-law who was also a first lady while in office.

Michelle Obama 

 First first lady who is African American.
 First first lady to attend an Ivy League university for her undergraduate degree. She majored in sociology and minored in African-American studies at Princeton University.
 First first lady to announce the winner of an Oscar (Best Picture which went to Argo).
 First first lady to host the Girl Scouts campout at the White House.

Melania Trump 

 First first lady not to have been born a citizen of the United States or in what would later become the United States. She was naturalized in 2006.
 First first lady to be born in Slovenia and continental Europe.
 First first lady to be fluent in a Slavic language.
 First first lady to be a non-native speaker of English.
 First first lady to be born in a Socialist country.
 First first lady to fly in a V-22 Osprey aircraft.

Jill Biden

 First first lady to have a research doctorate.
 First first lady to be an Italian American.
 First first lady to bring a rescue dog (Major) to the White House.
 First first lady to hold a paying job outside the White House while her husband was president.

See also
Bibliography of United States presidential spouses and first ladies
List of United States presidential firsts

Notes

References

Lists of firsts

Women-related lists